The 1962 Washington State Cougars football team was an American football team that represented Washington State University in the Athletic Association of Western Universities (AAWU, Big Six) during the 1962 NCAA University Division football season. In their seventh season under head coach Jim Sutherland, the Cougars compiled a 5–4–1 record (1–1 in AAWU, third), and outscored their opponents 213 to 167.

The team's statistical leaders included Dave Mathieson with 1,492 passing yards, George Reed with 503 rushing yards, and Hugh Campbell with 848 receiving yards.

Midway through the schedule, WSU was undefeated at 4–0–1, equaling their best start since 1936. They received a vote in that week's UPI Coaches Poll (tied for 23rd), but managed only a rally win at neighbor Idaho (in the snow) in the final five games.

After three years as an independent, WSU was admitted to the conference in the summer of 1962; due to advanced scheduling, they played few of the southern members (of California) per season until the late 1960s. The AAWU expanded to eight in 1964 with the addition of Oregon and Oregon State.

Schedule

Roster

NFL Draft
Two Cougars were selected in the 1963 NFL Draft, which was twenty rounds (280 selections).

References

External links
 Game program: San Jose State at WSU – September 22, 1962
 Game program: Stanford vs. WSU at Spokane – October 13, 1962
 Game program: Indiana vs. WSU at Spokane – October 20, 1962
 Game program: Oregon State at WSU – November 3, 1962
 Game program: Washington vs. WSU at Spokane – November 24, 1962

Washington State
Washington State Cougars football seasons
Washington State Cougars football